The Riverside Theatre is located at the Coleraine campus of Ulster University in Northern Ireland. It was opened in 1976 and is the fifth-largest professional theatre in Northern Ireland. It is architecturally unique in Northern Ireland for its flexible staging facilities. The Riverside Theatre won a design award in the year of its completion, and another shortly after for its provision for disabled patrons. 

It is an established touring venue. It features productions from all over the UK, Europe and North America. The Riverside programme incorporates drama, contemporary dance, rock bands, ballet, opera, variety, children's shows, pantomime, music recitals and recordings for television and radio.

External links
 Official website

Ulster University
Coleraine
Theatres in County Londonderry
University and college theatres in Northern Ireland